Latin Opinion is a bilingual monthly newspaper published in Baltimore, Maryland. It is published in both Spanish and English. The paper was founded in 2004 to serve the Baltimore Hispanic community's desire for a Spanish-language newspaper. The newspaper distributes 5,000 copies to churches, businesses, and community organizations in the Baltimore area.

References

External links
Official website

2004 establishments in Maryland
Bilingual newspapers
Biweekly newspapers published in the United States
Hispanic and Latino American culture in Baltimore
Newspapers published in Baltimore
Non-English-language newspapers published in Maryland
Newspapers established in 2004
Spanish-language mass media in Maryland
Spanish-language newspapers published in the United States